A refrain is a line or lines repeated in a verse or song.

Refrain may also refer to:

"Refrain" (Lys Assia song), winner of Eurovision 1956
"Refrain" (Mamoru Miyano song), 2009
Refrain (Stockhausen), a 1966 composition by Karlheinz Stockhausen
Refrain, a 2020 album by Boris and Z.O.A
"Refrain", a 1988 song by James from Strip-mine

See also